Half Mile Harvest is the debut studio album by Australian indie blues rock band The Teskey Brothers. The album was released on 12 January 2017 and peaked at number 18 on the ARIA Charts. A deluxe edition was released in October 2018, replacing the two cover songs on the standard track listing with two new original songs.

Background and release
Josh and Sam Teskey grew up in Warrandyte and met Brendon Love and Liam Gough and formed the Teskey Brothers in 2008. The Teskey Brothers have been performing around Melbourne since then. The album was recorded in Sam's studio space. In January 2017, the album was launched with a sold out Gasometer Hotel in Collingwood, which had a 150 capacity. Three months later, the group had sold out the 300-capacity Northcote Social Club and in May month they played four nights at the 800-capacity Corner Hotel in Richmond. In June 2017, the band played outside of Victoria for the first time.

Critical reception
Craig Mathieson from Sydney Morning Herald said "Josh's voice, a husky blue-eyed soul instrument that draws stinging regret out of the playing of his guitarist brother Sam, bassist Brendon Love, and drummer Liam Gough, is one element that has contributed to the band's sudden rise." adding "There's the influence of Fleetwood Mac's original avatar Peter Green on Sam's guitar playing, but the band often reveals a revivalist's dedication. The reckoning with heartbreak and swelling horn parts summon a bygone era."

Track listing

Charts

Release history

References

2017 debut albums
Self-released albums
The Teskey Brothers albums